Quatro de Fevereiro International Airport,  is the main international airport of Angola. It is located in the southern part of the capital Luanda, situated in the Luanda Province. Quatro de Fevereiro means 4th of February, which is an important national holiday in Angola, marking the start of the armed struggle against the Portuguese colonial regime on 4 February 1961. In 2009, about 1.8 million passengers were counted.

History
The construction of the airport began in 1951, in order to serve the capital of the former-Portuguese Overseas Province of Angola. It was inaugurated in 1954, by the Portuguese President Craveiro Lopes, which in his honor, the airport was named Aeroporto Presidente Craveiro Lopes (President Craveiro Lopes Airport).

In August, September, and October 1975 the airport hosted tens of thousands of mostly white Portuguese Angolans fleeing to Lisbon (during Operation Air Bridge) who camped-out while awaiting evacuation flights during the weeks before Angola's Independence.

Following Angola's independence from Portugal (in November 1975), the airport was renamed Aeroporto Quatro de Fevereiro Internacional (Fourth of February International Airport) to commemorate the events leading to the independence of the state.

Facilities 
Starting no earlier than 2022, the airport will be replaced by the new Angola International Airport. Construction work has already started, but its opening was postponed due to financial difficulties on the part of the Angolan government.

Airlines and destinations
The following airlines operate regular scheduled and charter flights at Luanda Quatro de Fevereiro Airport:

Statistics

Accidents and incidents
 On 26 March 1979, a cargo-configured Interflug Ilyushin Il-18 DM-STL overshot the runway following an engine failure during the take-off run. The aircraft broke up and erupted into flames, killing the ten people on board.
On 12 February 2000, a Transafrik International cargo Boeing 727 crashed upon landing on runway 23. Due to high winds gusting to between 50 and 80 knots, the aircraft had executed a missed approach, and upon the landing flare of the second attempt, witnesses saw the right wing touch the ground.
On 25 May 2003, a Boeing 727-223 with the registration number N844AA, which had been parked at the airport for over a year, was stolen in mysterious circumstances, and has never been found as of August 2022.
On 27 June 2009, a British Airways Boeing 777-200ER G-RAES was damaged, while it was parked, by a collision with a Hainan Airlines Airbus A340-600 B-6510.
On 31 January 2010, Guicango Yakovlev Yak-40 D2-FES suffered the collapse of all landing gears on landing after a flight from Cabinda.

References

External links

 
 
 Luanda Airport website by the operator ENANA EP

Airports in Angola
Buildings and structures in Luanda
Airports established in 1954
1954 establishments in Angola